Nonprofit Technology Resources (NTR) is a charitable nonprofit organization (NPO) inside Philadelphia, Pennsylvania that "serves low-income people in Philadelphia by recycling used computers, providing hands-on work experience, and assisting community-based service organizations to use computers in their work."

See also
A+ certification
Camara (charity)
Empower Up
Free Geek
World Computer Exchange
 Digital divide in the United States
 Global digital divide
Computer recycling
Electronic waste in the United States

External links
Nonprofit Technology Resources (official website)
Nonprofit Technology News

Information technology charities
Non-profit organizations based in Pennsylvania
Organizations based in Philadelphia